Unpredictable is the second solo studio album by American rapper Mystikal. It was released on November 11, 1997 via No Limit/Jive Records, making it his first album for the label. Production was handled by Beats By The Pound, DJ Daryl, Rick Rock, Studio Ton and The Legendary Traxster, with Master P serving as executive producer. It features guest appearances from Master P, Silkk the Shocker, O'Dell, B-Legit, E-40, Fiend, Mac, Mia X, and Snoop Dogg, who made his first appearance on a No Limit Records album, however he had not yet signed with the label and is credited as still being signed to Death Row Records in the album's liner notes.

The album was a huge success, peaking at number three on the Billboard 200 and topped the Top R&B/Hip-Hop Albums chart, and spawning two the singles "Ain't No Limit" and "The Man Right Chea". It was certified platinum by the Recording Industry Association of America on April 24, 1998.

Track listing

Sample credits
Track 4 contains a portion of the composition "Sir Nose D'voidoffunk" written by George Clinton, Bernie Worrell and Bootsy Collins
Track 6 contains a portion of the composition "Out on a Limb" written by Mary Christine Brockert
Track 9 contains a sample from "Who Got The Clout" written by Mia Young, Michael Tyler and Odell Vickers Jr.
Track 15 contains samples from "The Champ" written by Harry Palmer and performed by The Mohawks, "It's Yours" written by Rick Rubin as recorded by T La Rock, "Ain't No Half-Steppin'" written by Antonio Hardy and Marlon Williams

Charts

Weekly charts

Year-end charts

Certifications

See also
List of number-one R&B albums of 1997 (U.S.)

References

External links

1997 albums
Mystikal albums
Jive Records albums
No Limit Records albums
Albums produced by Rick Rock
Albums produced by Studio Ton
Gangsta rap albums by American artists
Albums produced by The Legendary Traxster